Ambliyasan Junction railway station is a railway station in Mahesana district, Gujarat, India on the Western line of the Western railway network. Passenger, DEMU trains halt here.

References 

Railway stations in Mahesana district
Ahmedabad railway division
Railway junction stations in Gujarat